Lee Eul-yong (Hangul: 이을용) (born 8 September 1975) is a South Korean football coach, manager and former player .

Early life 
Lee was born in Taebaek, Gangwon, and attended high school in Gangneung. He continued his football career during his school days, but he failed to join a university football club. He stopped playing football for a while before receiving an offer to join semi-professional club Korea Railroad.

International career
Lee was part of the South Korean national team in the 2002 FIFA World Cup. Noted for his accurate kicks including free-kicks, he provided two assists against Poland and the United States, and scored a free-kick against Turkey. After the World Cup, he transferred to Trabzonspor with the help of Tınaz Tırpan.

In September 2006, after a match against Chinese Taipei, Lee announced that he would retire from the national team to focus on FC Seoul and also to make way for younger players in the upcoming 2010 FIFA World Cup.

Eul-yong Ta

Lee is well known by most South Koreans and other Asian football fans for a famous incident which is sometimes referred as "Eul-yong Ta (을용타)," and roughly translated as 'Eul-yong Strike/Smash'. The incident occurred during a match against China in the inaugural East Asian Cup in December 2003.

During the second half of the game, Chinese forward Li Yi kicked Lee in the shins immediately after he finished his pass. Visually upset with Li's violent play, Lee slapped Li on the back of his head. Li Yi started rolling on the pitch grabbing his head in an apparent exaggeration. For a while the entire Chinese and Korean squad ran toward the scene but further conflict did not occur, as the referee awarded a yellow card for Li and red card for Lee. Korea defeated China in the match, and Lee became the source of a popular internet meme after the incident.

Career statistics

Club

International
Results list South Korea's goal tally first.

Filmography

Television

Honours

Player 
Sangmu FC
Korean Semi-professional League (Autumn): 1996, 1997
Korean National Championship: 1996

Bucheon SK
Korean League Cup: 2000+

Trabzonspor
Turkish Cup: 2003

FC Seoul
Korean League Cup runner-up: 2007

South Korea
 FIFA World Cup fourth place: 2002
 EAFF Championship: 2003

Entertainer

References

External links
 
 National Team Player Record 
 
 

1975 births
Living people
Association football wingers
South Korean footballers
South Korean expatriate footballers
South Korea international footballers
Daejeon Korail FC players
Gimcheon Sangmu FC players
Jeju United FC players
Trabzonspor footballers
FC Seoul players
FC Seoul non-playing staff
FC Seoul managers
Gangwon FC players
Korea National League players
K League 1 players
Süper Lig players
Expatriate footballers in Turkey
2002 CONCACAF Gold Cup players
2002 FIFA World Cup players
2004 AFC Asian Cup players
2006 FIFA World Cup players
South Korean expatriate sportspeople in Turkey
Dankook University alumni
South Korean football managers
People from Taebaek